Bronisław Dobrzyński was a Polish musician, pianist and composer. He was the son of Ignacy Feliks Dobrzyński.

He arranged his father's Symphony No. 2 for piano 4-hands and composed several minor pieces. He is most known for his book on his father's life and work (. Warszawa: [s.n.], 1893).

References

External links 
 

Polish musicians
Polish composers